A Sense of Reality is a collection of short stories by Graham Greene, first published in 1963. The book is composed of three short stories and a novella, Under the Garden. These stories share a marked change of style from Greene’s usual format, with the author plunging into fantasy, dreams, false memories and imagination.

Stories
Under the Garden
A Visit to Morin
Dream of a Strange Land
A Discovery in the Woods

References

Books by Graham Greene
1963 short story collections
The Bodley Head books
British short story collections